Neoantistea is a genus of dwarf sheet spiders that was first described by Willis J. Gertsch in 1934.

Species
 it contains twenty-five species:
Neoantistea agilis (Keyserling, 1887) (type) – USA, Canada
Neoantistea alachua Gertsch, 1946 – USA
Neoantistea aspembira Galán-Sánchez & Álvarez-Padilla, 2017 – Mexico
Neoantistea caporiaccoi Brignoli, 1976 – Kashmir
Neoantistea coconino Chamberlin & Ivie, 1942 – USA
Neoantistea crandalli Gertsch, 1946 – USA
Neoantistea gosiuta Gertsch, 1934 – USA
Neoantistea hidalgoensis Opell & Beatty, 1976 – Mexico
Neoantistea inaffecta Opell & Beatty, 1976 – Mexico
Neoantistea jacalana Gertsch, 1946 – Mexico
Neoantistea janetscheki Brignoli, 1976 – Nepal
Neoantistea kaisaisa Barrion & Litsinger, 1995 – Philippines
Neoantistea lyrica Opell & Beatty, 1976 – Mexico to Costa Rica
Neoantistea magna (Keyserling, 1887) – USA, Canada
Neoantistea maxima (Caporiacco, 1935) – Kashmir
Neoantistea mulaiki Gertsch, 1946 – USA, Mexico
Neoantistea multidentata Galán-Sánchez & Álvarez-Padilla, 2017 – Mexico
Neoantistea oklahomensis Opell & Beatty, 1976 – USA
Neoantistea procteri Gertsch, 1946 – USA
Neoantistea pueblensis Opell & Beatty, 1976 – Mexico
Neoantistea quelpartensis Paik, 1958 – Russia, China, Korea, Japan
Neoantistea riparia (Keyserling, 1887) – USA
Neoantistea santana Chamberlin & Ivie, 1942 – USA
Neoantistea spica Opell & Beatty, 1976 – Mexico
Neoantistea unifistula Opell & Beatty, 1976 – Mexico

References

Araneomorphae genera
Hahniidae
Spiders of Asia
Spiders of Europe
Spiders of North America